The Goldfield Bridge was a historic structure located in Goldfield, Iowa, United States. It was a  Concrete deck girder span over the Boone River. The bridge was built in 1921 for $40,584 by the Iowa Bridge Company. It was the most expensive structure built in Wright County up to that time. This bridge replaced an earlier pinned through truss span built by Des Moines bridge builder N.M. Stark. It was listed on the National Register of Historic Places (NRHP) in 1998. The present bridge replaced the historic structure in 2004. The historic bridge was removed from the NRHP in 2019.

References

Bridges completed in 1921
Transportation buildings and structures in Wright County, Iowa
Road bridges on the National Register of Historic Places in Iowa
National Register of Historic Places in Wright County, Iowa
Concrete bridges in the United States
Girder bridges in the United States
Former National Register of Historic Places in Iowa